Llanbister is a small village and community with a 2011 population of 382 in Powys, mid Wales, in the historic county of Radnorshire.

Facilities
The village is not directly served by a railway station: the nearest is Llanbister Road railway station which is about 5 miles east of the village. It is served by a bus service (the T4 operated by Stagecoach Wales) which connects Cardiff to Newtown via Merthyr Tydfil, Brecon, Builth Wells and Llandrindod Wells.

Llanbister is situated on the A483 main road from Newtown to Llandrindod Wells, at its junction with the B4356 road. It also lies next to the River Ithon which flows southward just west of the village.

In the past, there was a police station in Llanbister, on the north west outskirts of the village, but this has since been sold off as private housing.

Other facilities include a primary school, Llanbister C P School, a children's play area and a 200-person capacity community hall built in 1996 which has a stage and a 6.25m x 4m dance floor. There used to be a Post Office in the centre of the village but it is no longer operating: it was proposed for closure in 2008.

There is a Victorian pub and bed and breakfast hotel (The Lion Hotel) in the village and a caravan and camping site to the north west of the village, near the former police station.

There is an area of common land to the east of the village, named Llanbister Common. In July 1991 an unlicensed free music festival was held there, which was not well received by the local population, so in summer 1992 manure was spread on the land to make a repeat less likely. There is evidence of possible medieval ridge and furrow cultivation on Llanbister Common.

In 2018 the horror film You Should Have Left was partly filmed at a property near Llanbister, the John Pawson-designed Life House (Tŷ Bywyd) just east of the village.

Churches
The village has an Anglican church in the centre, St Cynllo's Parish Church (part of the Church in Wales), parts of which date from around AD 1300, as well as a Methodist church on the southern outskirts.

Notable residents
 Eleanor Bufton (1842–1893), the actress, was born here.

References

Villages in Powys